Isarapong Noonpakdee (20 November 1933 – 17 February 2017) was a Thai military officer who was Commander of the Royal Thai Army in 1992. Isarapong played a key role in the coup against the government of then Gen.Chatichai Choonhavan when he was deputy Army commander-in-chief. He became the secretary-general of the National Peacekeeping Council (NPKC) or the coup maker. Isarapong became the interior minister in the post-coup government of Anand Panyarachun. He later succeeded Suchinda Kraprayoon as Commander in Chief of the Royal Thai Army when Suchinda became the prime minister. He has received the Bravery Medal in 1991.

References

1930s births
2017 deaths
Isarapong Noonpakdee
Isarapong Noonpakdee
Isarapong Noonpakdee
Isarapong Noonpakdee
Isarapong Noonpakdee